Leslie Arthur Procter  (27 January 1884 – 21 April 1968) was an Australian politician.

He was born in Lefroy, Tasmania, son of Frederick and Sarah Procter (née Palmer). In 1939, with his occupation listed as coachbuilder, he was elected to the Tasmanian Legislative Council as the independent member for South Esk. He held the seat until his retirement in 1962. Procter died in Launceston in 1968, aged 84.

References

1884 births
1968 deaths
Independent members of the Parliament of Tasmania
Members of the Tasmanian Legislative Council
Members of the Order of the British Empire
20th-century Australian politicians